Ketting is a surname. Notable persons with the surname include:

Jeroen Ketting (born 1980), English footballer
Rick Ketting (born 1996), Dutch footballer